The 2007 Biathlon Junior World Championships was held in Martell, Italy from January 24 to January 31 2007. There was to be a total of 16 competitions: sprint, pursuit, individual, mass start, and relay races for men and women.

Medal winners

Youth Women

Junior Women

Youth Men

Junior Men

Medal table

References

External links
Official IBU website 

Biathlon Junior World Championships
2007 in biathlon
2007 in Italian sport
International sports competitions hosted by Italy
2007 in youth sport